The Putnam Cemetery is a historic cemetery on SE Metro Parkway, just south of Walton Boulevard, in Bentonville, Arkansas.  Now completely surrounded by commercial development, this small cemetery (less than ) is ringed by an iron fence with an arch identifying it, and is located just behind hotels that front on Walton Boulevard.  The cemetery was established in 1860, and was the family burial ground of the Putnam family, who were some of Benton County's earliest settlers.  It has fourteen marked graves, and an unknown number of unmarked ones.

The cemetery was listed on the National Register of Historic Places in 2004.

See also
 National Register of Historic Places listings in Benton County, Arkansas

References

External links
 

Cemeteries on the National Register of Historic Places in Arkansas
National Register of Historic Places in Bentonville, Arkansas
1860 establishments in Arkansas
Cemeteries established in the 1860s